Panade may refer to:

 A Belizean empanada
 A small Majorcan meat pie, commonly served during Holy Week
 Pănade, a river in Alba County, Romania
 Pănade, a village in the commune of Sâncel, Alba County, Romania
 Panade, the roux used to prepare choux pastry
 Panada, a kind of bread soup